The Little Train Robbery is a 1905 American silent Western film. It is a parodic sequel to the 1903 film The Great Train Robbery with an all-child cast, released on September 1, 1905. Both were directed by Edwin S. Porter.

Plot
The opening scene shows the interior of the robbers' den. The walls are decorated with the portraits of notorious criminals and pictures illustrating the exploits of famous bandits. Some of the gang are lounging about, while others are reading novels and illustrated papers. Although of youthful appearance, each is dressed like a typical Western desperado. The "Bandit Queen," leading a blindfolded new recruit, now enters the room. He is led to the center of the room, raises his right hand and is solemnly sworn in. When the bandage is removed from his eyes he finds himself looking into the muzzles of a dozen or more 45's. The gang then congratulates the new member and heartily shake his hand. The "Bandit Queen" who is evidently the leader of the gang, now calls for volunteers to hold up a train. All respond, but she picks out seven for the job who immediately leave the cabin.

The next scene shows the gang breaking into a barn. They steal ponies and ride away. Upon reaching the place agreed upon they picket their ponies and leaving them in charge of a trusted member proceed to a wild mountain spot in a bend of the railroad, where the road runs over a steep embankment. The spot is an ideal one for holding up a train. Cross ties are now placed on the railroad track and the gang hide in some bushes close by and wait for the train. The train soon approaches and is brought to a stop. The engineer leaves his engine and proceeds to remove the obstruction on the track. While he is bending over one of the gang sneaks up behind them and hits him on the head with an axe, and knocks him senseless down the embankment, while the gang surround the train and hold up the passengers. After securing all the "valuables," consisting principally of candy and dolls, the robbers uncouple the engine and one car and make their escape just in time to avoid a posse of police who appear on the scene. Further up the road they abandon the engine and car, take to the woods and soon reach their ponies.

In the meantime the police have learned the particulars of the hold-up from the frightened passengers and have started up the railroad tracks after the fleeing robbers. The robbers are next seen riding up the bed of a shallow stream and finally reach their den, where the remainder of the gang have been waiting for them. Believing they have successfully eluded their pursuers, they proceed to divide the "plunder." The police, however, have struck the right trail and are in close pursuit. While the "plunder" is being divided a sentry gives the alarm and the entire gang, abandoning everything, rush from the cabin barely in time to escape capture. The police make a hurried search and again start in pursuit. The robbers are so hard pressed that they are unable to reach their ponies, and are obliged to take chances on foot. The police now get in sight of the fleeing robbers and a lively chase follows through tall weeds, over a bridge and up a steep hill. Reaching a pond the police are close on their heels. The foremost robbers jump in clothes and all and strike out for the opposite bank. Two hesitate and are captured. Boats are secured and after an exciting tussle the entire gang is rounded up. In the mix up one of the police is dragged overboard. The final scene shows the entire gang of bedraggled and crestfallen robbers tied together with a rope and being led away by the police. Two of the police are loaded down with revolvers, knives and cartridge belts, and resemble walking arsenals. As a fitting climax a confederate steals out of the woods, cuts the rope and gallantly rescues the "Bandit Queen."

Filming
Filmed circa August 1905 in Olympia Park, near Connellsville, Pennsylvania.

Distribution
The film was released to the public in 1905 by the Edison Manufacturing Company and the Kleine Optical Company.

References

External links
 
 The Little Train Robbery at Internet Archive

1905 films
1905 Western (genre) films
1900s crime films
American black-and-white films
American crime films
American parody films
American silent short films
Films directed by Edwin S. Porter
Rail transport films
Silent American Western (genre) films
1900s American films
Silent American comedy films